Francisco Costas (born 21 October 1907, date of death unknown) was a Mexican sprinter. He competed in the men's 100 metres at the 1928 Summer Olympics.

References

External links
 

1907 births
Year of death missing
Mexican male sprinters
Athletes from Mexico City
Olympic athletes of Mexico
Athletes (track and field) at the 1928 Summer Olympics
Central American and Caribbean Games silver medalists for Mexico
Competitors at the 1926 Central American and Caribbean Games
Central American and Caribbean Games medalists in athletics
20th-century Mexican people